Bruce Tegner was a martial artist, author, and actor. Bruce was born in 1929 and died in 1985. Bruce practiced a number of martial arts including Savate, Judo, Karate, and Jujitsu.   His books were key in the development of others into martial arts including Paul Weitz and Chris Weitz.  He additionally choreographed a fight scene in the movie Manchurian Candidate. In addition he appeared in a number of TV shows including The Adventures of Ozzie and Harriet. In 1963 Bruce Tegner founded the self defense oriented martial art of Jukado based on Japanese Judo and Ju Jitsu,Karate,Aikido and stick fighting.

Personal life
Bruce was married to Alice McGrath.

List of Books
 Bruce Tegner's Complete Book of Jujitsu
 Complete Book of Judo
 Self-defense for Your Child
 Isometric Power Exercises
 Judo: Beginner to Black Belt
 Kung Fu & Tai Chi: Chinese Karate & Classical Exercises
 Stick Fighting: Self-defense
 Aikido & Bokata
 Karate, Beginner to Black Belt
 Defense Tactics for Law Enforcement: Weaponless Defense
 Bruce Tegner's Complete Book of Self-defense
 Savate: French Foot and Fist Fighting
 Karate: The Open Hand and Foot Fighting
 Bruce Tegner's Compete Book of Jukado:Self Defense

References

American martial artists
Martial arts writers
1929 births
1985 deaths